András Vargha (born Budapest, 29 November 1949) is a Hungarian psychologist and statistician, head of the Institute of Psychology of the Károli Gáspár University of Reformed Church. His research field is psychometrics, on which he has held conferences.

As of May 2011, Vargha had 131 journal publications with an impact factor of 14050, and has worked or continues to work as a reviewer with academic journals.

Notes and references

1949 births
Living people
Academic staff of the Károli Gáspár University of the Reformed Church in Hungary
Psychometricians
Hungarian statisticians
Hungarian psychologists
Quantitative psychologists